Ignacio "Pépito" Pavon (12 February 1941 – 17 October 2012) was a Spanish footballer.

He was the father of Michel Pavon.

References

1941 births
2012 deaths
Association football midfielders
Spanish footballers
Olympique de Marseille players
Ligue 1 players
Ligue 2 players